Arsenic and Old Lace is a 1944 American black comedy film directed by Frank Capra and starring Cary Grant. The screenplay by Julius J. Epstein and Philip G. Epstein is based on Joseph Kesselring's 1941 play of the same name. The contract with the play's producers stipulated that the film would not be released until the Broadway run ended. The original planned release date was September 30, 1942. The play was hugely successful, running for three and a half years, so the film was not released until 1944.

The lead role of Mortimer Brewster was originally intended for Bob Hope, but he could not be released from his contract with Paramount Pictures. Capra had also approached Jack Benny and Richard Travis before learning that Grant would accept the role. On the Broadway stage, Boris Karloff played Jonathan Brewster, who is said to "look like Boris Karloff". According to Turner Classic Movies, Karloff, who gave permission for the use of his name in the film, remained in the play to appease the producers, who were afraid of what stripping the play of all its primary cast would do to ticket sales. Raymond Massey took Karloff's place on screen. The film's supporting cast also features Jack Carson, Priscilla Lane, Peter Lorre, and Edward Everett Horton.

Josephine Hull and Jean Adair portray the Brewster sisters, Abby and Martha, respectively. Hull and Adair, as well as John Alexander (who played Teddy Brewster), reprised their roles from the 1941 stage production. Hull and Adair both received an eight-week leave of absence from the stage production, which was still running, but Karloff did not, as he was an investor in the stage production and its main draw. The entire film was shot within those eight weeks. The film cost just over $1.2 million of a $2 million budget to produce.

Plot
The Brewster family of Brooklyn, New York, is descended from Mayflower settlers. Several illustrious forebears' portraits line the walls of the ancestral home.

Mortimer Brewster, a writer who has repeatedly denounced marriage as "an old-fashioned superstition", falls in love with Elaine Harper, his neighbor and the minister's daughter. On Halloween day, Mortimer and Elaine get married. Elaine goes to her father's house to tell her father and pack for the honeymoon and Mortimer returns to Abby and Martha, the aunts who raised him in the old family home. Mortimer's brother, Teddy, who believes he is Theodore Roosevelt, resides with them. Each time Teddy goes upstairs, he yells "Charge!" and runs up the stairs, imitating Roosevelt's famous 1898 charge up San Juan Hill.

Searching for the notes for his next book, Mortimer finds a corpse hidden in the window seat. He assumes in horror that Teddy's delusions have led him to murder. Abby and Martha cheerfully explain that they are responsible, that as serial murderers, they minister to lonely old bachelors by ending their "suffering". They post a "Room for Rent" sign to attract a victim, then serve a glass of elderberry wine spiked with arsenic, strychnine, and cyanide while getting acquainted with them. The bodies are buried in the basement by Teddy, who believes they are yellow fever victims who perished in the building of the Panama Canal.

While Mortimer digests this information, his brother Jonathan arrives with his alcoholic accomplice, plastic surgeon Dr. Herman Einstein. Jonathan is also a serial murderer trying to escape from the police and dispose of his latest victim, Mr. Spinalzo. Jonathan's face, altered by Einstein while drunk, resembles Boris Karloff's Frankenstein monster makeup. Jonathan learns his aunts' secret and proposes to bury his victim in the cellar. Abby and Martha object vehemently because their victims were "nice" gentlemen while Jonathan's victim is a stranger and a "foreigner". Jonathan also declares his intention to kill Mortimer.

Elaine is impatient to leave on their honeymoon but is concerned about Mortimer's increasingly odd behavior as he frantically attempts to control the situation. He tries unsuccessfully to alert the bumbling police to Jonathan's presence. To draw attention away from his aunts and deprive them of their willing but uncomprehending accomplice, Mortimer tries to file paperwork to have Teddy legally committed to a mental asylum. Worrying that the genetic predisposition for mental illness resides within him, Mortimer explains to Elaine that he can't remain married to her.

Eventually Jonathan is arrested, Einstein flees after signing Teddy's commitment papers, Teddy is safely consigned to an institution, and his aunts insist upon joining him. Upon hearing that Mortimer signed the commitment papers as next of kin, Abby and Martha are concerned they may be null and void; they inform Mortimer that he is not a Brewster after all: his mother was the family cook and his father was a chef on a steamship. Relieved, he lustily kisses Elaine and whisks her off to their honeymoon.

Cast

Background
The play Arsenic and Old Lace was written by Joseph Kesselring, son of German immigrants and a former professor at Bethel College, a pacifist Mennonite college. It was written in the anti-war atmosphere of the late 1930s. Capra scholar Matthew C. Gunter argues that the deep theme of both the play and film is America's difficulty in coming to grips with both the positive and negative consequences of the liberty it professes to uphold, and which the Brewsters demand. Although their house is the nicest in the street, there are 12 bodies in the basement. That inconsistency is a metaphor for America's struggle to reconcile the violence of much of its past with the pervasive myths about its role as a beacon of freedom.

To recreate the country home that was central to the plot of George Washington Slept Here (1942), the house in Arsenic and Old Lace, which was actually shot in 1941 for a later theatrical release, was used. To ensure it looked the part of a dilapidated home, Warner Bros. crews knocked out bannisters, rafters and floors on the set.

Reception

Box office
According to Warner Bros. records, the film grossed $2,836,000 domestically and $1,948,000 internationally.

Critical response
The contemporary critical reviews were uniformly positive. The New York Times critic summed up the majority view, "As a whole, Arsenic and Old Lace, the Warner picture which came to the Strand yesterday, is good macabre fun." Variety declared, "Capra's production, not elaborate, captures the color and spirit of the play, while the able writing team of Julius J. and Philip G. Epstein has turned in a very workable, tightly-compressed script. Capra's own intelligent direction rounds out." Harrison's Reports wrote: "An hilarious entertainment, it should turn out to be one of the year's top box-office attractions." John Lardner of The New Yorker called the film "practically as funny in picture form as it did on the stage, and that is very funny indeed."

Assessing the film in 1968, Charles Higham and Joel Greenberg state in Hollywood in the Forties that "Frank Capra provided a rather overstated and strained version of Arsenic and Old Lace".

On the review aggregator website Rotten Tomatoes, the film holds an approval rating of 85% based on 33 reviews, with an average rating of 7.7/10.

The film is recognized by American Film Institute in these lists:
 2000: AFI's 100 Years...100 Laughs – #30

Radio adaptations
Arsenic and Old Lace was adapted as a half-hour radio play for the November 25, 1946, broadcast of The Screen Guild Theater with Boris Karloff and Eddie Albert. A one-hour adaptation was broadcast on January 25, 1948 on the Ford Theatre, with Josephine Hull, Jean Adair, and John Alexander reprising their roles.

See also
 List of American films of 1944
 Amy Archer-Gilligan – a nursing home owner accused of murdering elderly men in her care 1910–1917
 Black Widow murders – a real murder case whose events were compared to the fictional murders in the film

Notes

References

Bibliography

 
 
 
 
 Stout, Kathryn and Richard. Movies as Literature. Wilmington, Delaware: Design-A-Study, 2002.  (Study questions on the plot, pp. 41–46.)

External links

 
 
 
 
 

1944 films
1944 comedy films
1944 crime films
1940s American films
1940s black comedy films
1940s comedy mystery films
1940s comedy thriller films
1940s crime comedy films
1940s crime thriller films
1940s English-language films
1940s screwball comedy films
1940s serial killer films
American black comedy films
American black-and-white films
American comedy mystery films
American comedy thriller films
American crime comedy films
American crime thriller films
American films based on plays
American screwball comedy films
American serial killer films
Film noir
Films about disability
Films directed by Frank Capra
Films scored by Max Steiner
Films set in Brooklyn
Films with screenplays by Julius J. Epstein
Films with screenplays by Philip G. Epstein
Warner Bros. films
Works about plastic surgery